Willie Parker (born 1980) is an American football player.

Willie Parker may also refer to:

 Willie Parker (offensive lineman) (born 1948), American football player
 Willie Parker (defensive tackle) (born 1945), American football player
 Willie Parker (physician), American physician